Wilbur and Martha Carter House is a historic home located at Greensboro, Guilford County, North Carolina. It was built in 1951 and is a one-story, "L"-plan, Modern Movement style dwelling. It consists of two gable-roofed intersecting wings and features a carport, recessed entrance, and massive brick chimney. The finishes include native bluestone, red brick, and wormy chestnut siding. The house shows the influence of Frank Lloyd Wright’s Usonian type.  Also on the property are a contributing horse barn and shed.

It was listed on the National Register of Historic Places in 2008.

References

Houses on the National Register of Historic Places in North Carolina
Architecture in North Carolina
Houses completed in 1951
Houses in Greensboro, North Carolina
National Register of Historic Places in Guilford County, North Carolina